Prairie Township is an inactive township in Howard County, in the U.S. state of Missouri.

Prairie Township was named for the prairie lands within its borders.

References

Townships in Missouri
Townships in Howard County, Missouri